The Office of Defense Cooperation Turkey (ODC-T) to Turkey is a United States Security Assistance Organization (SAO) to Turkey. It was established in 1947 as the Joint American Military Mission for Aid to Turkey (JAMMAT), and renamed the Joint United States Military Mission for Aid to Turkey (JUSMMAT) in 1958. It became the ODC-T in 1994. After Turkey joined NATO in 1952, JAMMAT became the largest of the United States European Commands (USEUCOM).

History
After the British government declared on 21 February 1947 its inability to provide financial aid (though she would establish the Central Treaty Organization a decade later), Turkey turned towards the United States, who drew up the Truman Doctrine, pledging to "support free peoples who are resisting attempted subjugation by armed minorities or by outside pressures". $100 million was appropriated two months after the US Congress ratified the Truman Doctrine on 12 March 1947. This figure was raised to $233 million by 1950, after Turkey contributed a brigade of about 5000 men to the United Nations forces in the Korean War. In August 1947, the Joint American Military Mission for Aid to Turkey (JAMMAT) was established in Ankara under the authority of the US ambassador.

On 5 October 1947, a delegation of senior Turkish military officials traveled to the United States to establish the military framework of the co-operation agreement.

After joining the North Atlantic Treaty Organization (NATO) on 18 February 1952, Turkey signed a Military Facilities Agreement on 23 June 1954, paving the way for a large scale US military presence. With a staff of 1200 by 1959, JAMMAT was the largest of the United States European Commands (USEUCOM), and also the world's largest military assistance and advisory group by 1951. JAMMAT was renamed to Joint United States Military Mission for Aid to Turkey (JUSMMAT) in 1958, and the Office of Defense Cooperation Turkey (ODC-T) on 1 May 1994.

References

External links
 Benson, A Brief History of U.S. Forces in Turkey, 1947-1978
 Simon Duke, U.S. Military Forces and Installations in Europe, Oxford University Press for SIPRI, 1989
 Munson IV, Howard Adelbert (2012), THE JOINT AMERICAN MILITARY MISSION TO AID TURKEY: IMPLEMENTING THE TRUMAN DOCTRINE AND TRANSFORMING U.S. FOREIGN POLICY, 1947-1954
 Building For Peace: U.S. Army Engineers in Europe 1945-1991 (2007), Chapter 3, CEHO
 Joseph C. Satterthwaite (1972), "The Truman Doctrine: Turkey", Annals of the American Academy of Political and Social Science, Vol 401, May 1972
 Beginning of mission - https://history.state.gov/historicaldocuments/frus1947v05/d138

Commands of the United States Armed Forces
United States Security Assistance Organizations
Turkey–United States military relations